is a Japanese voice actress and singer affiliated with Raccoon Dog. She debuted in 2014, acted her first main role in Time Bokan 24, and has since received more major and leading roles. Her nickname is Akarin. She made her debut as a solo singer under Pony Canyon in October 2019.

Biography 
At an early age, she became familiar with anime, games, and manga due to her father's influence. She was in the Light Music Club at her high school and chose to play the bass because she did not want to stand out, but little did she know that others would have had the same thought, so she instead took up the role of vocalist. She had always thought she would become an illustrator, but right before graduating from high school, she was told by her parents that they could not afford to pay for her university education and that instead, she would have to apply for a scholarship. Because she was from Aichi Prefecture which is four hours away from Tokyo, moving to Tokyo never crossed her mind. After consideration, she decided to save money attending and instead decided to move to Tokyo to become a voice actress seeing as she was still young and wanted a challenge. A year or two into moving to Tokyo, her grandmother who she was extremely close to was dying. At the same time, jobs and audition calls were scarce, so she was constantly worried about her financial situation. She considers this the most painful time of her life. She told herself that if she did not make it as a voice actress, she would become an illustrator instead.

Filmography

Anime series

Original net animation

Anime films

Video games

Dubbing

Live-action
Doctor Strange in the Multiverse of Madness (America Chavez)
Shazam! Fury of the Gods (Anthea)

Animation
The Boss Baby: Family Business (Creepy Girl)

Discography 
For her discography as her Love Live! Nijigasaki Highschool Idol Club character Kanata Konoe see here

Singles

Mini albums

Albums

References

External links
 
 

1994 births
Living people
Anime singers
Japanese women pop singers
Japanese video game actresses
Japanese voice actresses
Nijigasaki High School Idol Club members
Pony Canyon artists
Voice actresses from Aichi Prefecture
21st-century Japanese actresses
21st-century Japanese singers
21st-century Japanese women singers